"Between Blue Eyes and Jeans" is a song written by Ken McDuffie, and recorded by American country music artist Conway Twitty.  It was released in July 1985 as the second single from the album Don't Call Him a Cowboy.  The song reached #3 on the Billboard Hot Country Singles & Tracks chart.

Charts

Weekly charts

Year-end charts

References

1985 singles
Conway Twitty songs
Warner Records singles
1985 songs